Rustrel is a commune in the Vaucluse department in the Provence-Alpes-Côte d'Azur region of Southeastern France. In 2017, it had a population of 688.

Sights
This village is famous for its ochre, which many people come to visit in the French Colorado.

See also
Communes of the Vaucluse department
Luberon

References

Communes of Vaucluse